The 1914 Rock Island Independents season was the team's last season under manager/owner John Roche. The season resulted in the team posting a 5–2 record.

Schedule

References

Rock Island Independents seasons
Rock Island
Rock Island